John Joseph Curtis (13 December 1888 – 8 March 1955) was an English professional footballer who played in the Football League for Sunderland, Gainsborough Trinity, Tottenham Hotspur, Fulham, Stockport County and Middlesbrough as an outside left. He is best remembered for his four-year spell with Tottenham Hotspur between 1909 and 1913 and later coached in the Netherlands.

Career 
An outside left, Curtis began his career with spells at non-League clubs Eston United, South Bank St Peters, South Bank, Shildon Athletic, a period which was bisected by an unsuccessful spell with First Division club Sunderland during the 1906–07 season. Curtis joined Second Division club Gainsborough Trinity in 1908 and scored two goals in 30 league appearances, before joining divisional rivals Tottenham Hotspur the following year. Almost immediately after Curtis joined the club, promotion to the First Division was achieved and he went on to score five goals in 89 appearances during just over five years at White Hart Lane. After leaving White Hart Lane in 1913, Curtis had spells at Fulham, Brentford, Stockport County and Middlesbrough, before rejoining Shildon Athletic in 1920, where he ended his career.

Personal life 
Curtis enlisted as a driver in the Royal Field Artillery in early 1915 during the First World War. He served with the 36th Battery of the 1A Reserve Brigade.

Career statistics

References 

1888 births
1955 deaths
People from South Bank, Redcar and Cleveland
Footballers from Yorkshire
English footballers
Association football outside forwards
Eston United F.C. players
South Bank St Peters F.C. players
Sunderland A.F.C. players
South Bank F.C. players
Shildon A.F.C. players
Gainsborough Trinity F.C. players
Tottenham Hotspur F.C. players
Fulham F.C. players
Brentford F.C. players
Stockport County F.C. players
Middlesbrough F.C. players
English Football League players
Southern Football League players
British Army personnel of World War I
Brentford F.C. wartime guest players
Newcastle United F.C. wartime guest players
Royal Field Artillery soldiers
English expatriate football managers
Expatriate football managers in the Netherlands